Richard S. Westfall (April 22, 1924 – August 21, 1996) was an American academic, biographer and historian of science. He is best known for his biography of Isaac Newton and his work on the scientific revolution of the 17th century.

Life
Born in Fort Collins, Colorado, Westfall graduated from high school in 1942 and enrolled at Yale University. His time at Yale was interrupted by two years of service in World War II, but he returned to complete his B.A. degree in 1948. He subsequently earned M.A. and Ph.D. degrees from Yale, with a dissertation entitled Science and Religion in Seventeenth Century England. The work was an early example of his lifelong interest in the history of science and its relationship to religion.

Westfall taught history at various universities in the 1950s and 1960s: California Institute of Technology (1952–53), State University of Iowa (1953–57), and Grinnell College (1957–63). He began teaching at Indiana University in 1963 and worked his way up the faculty ranks until his retirement in 1989 as Distinguished Professor Emeritus.  He died in 1996 in Bloomington, Indiana at the age of 72.

Work

In 1980 Westfall published what is widely regarded as the definitive biography of Isaac Newton, Never at Rest.   Westfall considered Newton a driven, neurotic, often humorless and vengeful individual. Despite these personal faults, Westfall ranked Newton as the most important man in the history of European civilization.  Westfall published a condensed and simplified version of the biography as The Life of Isaac Newton in 1993.

Westfall published other books on the history of science, including The Construction of Modern Science: Mechanisms and Mechanics (1971), Force in Newton's Physics: the Science of Dynamics in the Seventeenth Century (1971), and Essays on the Trial of Galileo (1989). Late in life he constructed a database of information on the lives and careers of more than 600  scientists of the early modern era, his Catalog of the Scientific Community in the 16th and 17th Centuries, which he made available to other researchers.

Recognition and awards

Westfall received many awards, most notably election as a fellow of the American Academy of Arts and Sciences and the Royal Society of Literature, and the Sarton Medal of the History of Science Society.  His Never at Rest earned the History of Science Society's Pfizer Award in 1983 as the best book in the history of science and the American Historical Association's Leo Gershoy Award in 1982 as the most outstanding work published in English on any aspect of seventeenth- and eighteenth-century European history.  He also received the History of Science Society's Pfizer Award in 1972 for his Force in Newton's Physics and the society's Derek Price Prize in 1987 for his article, "Scientific Patronage: Galileo and the Telescope."

Notes

References
Religion, Science, and Worldview : Essays in Honor of Richard S. Westfall, edited by Margaret J. Osler and Paul Lawrence Farber, Cambridge University Press 1985

External links
Galileo Project page for Richard S. Westfall

Archives Online at Indiana University: Richard S. Westfall papers, 1942-1996
 

1924 births
1996 deaths
20th-century American historians
American male non-fiction writers
Historians of science
20th-century American biographers
Newton scholars
20th-century American male writers